"Ever Again" is a song by Swedish singer-songwriter Robyn, recorded for her eighth studio album Honey. It was released as the fourth single from the album on 17 June 2019 along with an accompanying music video. The song was included on Rolling Stones list of the 50 Best Songs of 2018, placing at number 33. Three official remixes by Planningtorock, Soulwax, and Patrick Topping were released on 9 July, 23 August, and 4 October 2019 respectively.

Music video
The music video for "Ever Again" is directed by Colin Solal Cardo and features Robyn surrounded by various statues of Greek mythology in a landscape described by the singer as "a dreamy place, somewhere undefined, somewhere in my unconsciousness." The silk blouse and latex jumpsuit that Robyn wears in the music video were custom made by French designer Nicolas Ghesquière.

Live performances
Robyn first performed "Ever Again" on The Ellen DeGeneres Show on 22 February 2019. On 12 March 2019 Robyn performed the song on The Late Show with Stephen Colbert. The song was also included in the set list for her Honey Tour.

Release
On 20 June 2020, Robyn released "Ever Again" on limited edition 12" vinyl featuring remixes of the song. It was released as part of a Honey Remix vinyl series, alongside "Honey", "Baby Forgive Me" and "Between the Lines / Beach2k20", for the Love Record Stores Day 2020 event. Only 500 of each were manufactured.

Track listing

Personnel
Credits adapted from the liner notes of Honey.
 Robyn – vocals, vocal arranging, songwriting, vocal recording
 Joseph Mount – electric guitar, vocal arranging, songwriting, production, vocal recording
 Ulf Engström – bass guitar
 David Jones – studio assistance
 NealHPogue – mixing
 Mike Bozzi – mastering

Charts

References

2019 singles
2018 songs
Robyn songs
Songs written by Robyn
Songs written by Joseph Mount